Bart de Vries (29 December 1964 – 6 December 2022) was a Dutch stage and television actor.

Biography
De Vries was born in Rotterdam in 1964. He was the son of actor Rob de Vries and the brother of actor Edwin de Vries. He was married to actress Lidewij Benus.

Bart de Vries attended acting workshops with Jules Croiset and Ton Lutz. As stage actor De Vries played in the musical of Soldier of Orange and 3 Musketiers. He also directed plays. As a television actor he was in many television series including: Baantjer, Flikken Maastricht,  and Van God Los.

Terminally ill, De Vries died from complications of COVID-19 on 6 December 2022, at the age of 57.

References

1964 births
2022 deaths
Dutch television actors
Dutch stage actors
People from Rotterdam
Place of death missing
Deaths from the COVID-19 pandemic in the Netherlands